The Seventh Ministry of Machine Building (第七机械工业部), originally the Fifth Academy of the Ministry of National Defense, was a government ministry of the People's Republic of China, established November 23, 1964 by the State Council to oversee the space industry.

In April 1988 the Ministry merged with the Ministry of the Aviation Industry and adopted the name of the Ministry of Aviation and Space Industry.

See also
First Ministry of Machine-Building of the PRC
Second Ministry of Machine-Building of the PRC, ministry of nuclear industry
Third Ministry of Machine-Building of the PRC, ministry of aviation industry
Fourth Ministry of Machine-Building of the PRC, ministry of electronics industry
Fifth Ministry of Machine-Building of the PRC, ministry of tank equipment and artillery
Sixth Ministry of Machine-Building of the PRC, ministry of shipbuilding
Eighth Ministry of Machine-Building of the PRC

Bibliography
 Malcolm Lamb: Directory of officials and Organizations in China, ME Sharpe Inc. Armonk, NY, 2003, p. 1911 +, Volume 1
 China's Economic System, Routledge Abingdon 2005, 594 p., 

Government ministries of the People's Republic of China